was a Japanese actor and comedian. Born in Hirakata, Osaka, he graduated from Kitano Middle School (now Kitano High School), and attended Waseda University. He began his career as a stage actor, then became an announcer for NHK, working in Manchukuo. He became famous in films first for comedy roles, appearing in series such as the "Company President" (Shacho) and "Station Front" (Ekimae) series, produced by Toho. He appeared in nearly 250 films, both contemporary  and jidaigeki. He was also famous on stage playing Tevye in the Japanese version of Fiddler on the Roof. He also appeared in television series and specials, and was the first guest on the television talk show Tetsuko's Room in 1975. He was long-time head of the Japan Actors Union. Among many honors, Morishige received the Order of Culture from the Emperor of Japan in 1991.

Hisaya Morishige died of natural causes at a hospital in Tokyo at 8:16 A.M. on November 10, 2009, at the age of 96.

Filmography

Film

Television

Dubbing

Songs 
 Shiretoko Ryojō, a song about the Shiretoko Peninsula

Writings

Honours 
Medal with Purple Ribbon (1975)
Person of Cultural Merit (1984)
Order of the Precious Crown, 2nd Class, Peony (1987)
Order of Culture (1991)
Honorary citizen of Tokyo (1997)
People's Honour Award (2009, Posthumous award)
Junior Third Rank (2009, Posthumous award)

References

External links 

 
 

1913 births
2009 deaths
Japanese male film actors
20th-century Japanese businesspeople
Japanese male singer-songwriters
Japanese people from Manchukuo
People from Hirakata
Japanese racehorse owners and breeders
Japanese comedians
Japanese radio personalities
20th-century Japanese male actors
21st-century Japanese male actors
People's Honour Award winners
Persons of Cultural Merit
Recipients of the Order of Culture
Musicians from Osaka Prefecture
Japanese male voice actors
Recipients of the Medal with Purple Ribbon
20th-century comedians
20th-century Japanese male singers
20th-century Japanese singers